Danielle Rodrigues Lins, better known as Dani Lins (born January 5, 1985), is a volleyball player from Brazil, who plays as a setter. She represented her country at the FIVB World Grand Prix 2009 in Tokyo, Japan, where they won the gold medal. In 2012, she became an Olympic champion at the 2012 Summer Olympics.

Career
Born in Recife, Dani Lins defended for Finasa/Osasco from 2003 to 2005, moving to Pinheiros/Blue Life for the 2005–06 season, then joining Unilever in 2006.

Lins won the bronze medal in the 2014 FIVB Club World Championship after her team defeated the Swiss club Voléro Zürich, 3–2.

National team
Dani Lins helped her country finish in fourth place at the Pan American Games and in the Women's Pan-American Volleyball Cup, both played in 2003. Brazilian national team head coach Zé Roberto chose her on August 1, 2009, to replace Fofão as the team captain. She won the FIVB World Grand Prix in 2009.

Lins was part of the national team who won the gold medal at the 2011 Pan American Games held in Guadalajara, Mexico. She also won the Best Setter award.

In 2012 Dani won the gold medal at the 2012 Olympic Games.

Lins played with her national team, winning the bronze at the 2014 World Championship when her team defeated Italy 3–2 in the bronze medal match.

Awards

Individuals
 2009 South American Club Championship – "Best Server"
 2009 South American Championship – "Best Setter"
 2011 World Grand Prix – "Best Setter"
 2011 Pan American Games – "Best Setter"
 2013 Montreux Volley Masters – "Best Setter"
 2014 South American Club Championship – "Best Setter"
 2014 FIVB World Grand Prix – "Best Setter"
 2015 South American Club Championship – "Best Setter"

Clubs
 2014 FIVB Club World Championship –  Bronze medal, with SESI-SP
 2014 South American Club Championship –  Champion, with SESI-SP
 2015 South American Club Championship –  Runner-up, with Molico/Osasco
 2004–05 Brazilian Superliga –  Champion, with Finasa/Osasco
 2006–07 Brazilian Superliga –  Champion, with Rexona/Ades
 2007–08 Brazilian Superliga –  Champion, with Rexona/Ades
 2008–09 Brazilian Superliga –  Champion, with Rexona/Ades
 2009–10 Brazilian Superliga –  Runner up, with Rexona/Ades
 2010–11 Brazilian Superliga –  Champion, with Unilever Vôlei
 2013–14 Brazilian Superliga –  Runner up, with SESI-SP
 2016–17 Brazilian Superliga –  Runner up, with Vôlei Nestlé

References

1985 births
Living people
Brazilian women's volleyball players
Volleyball players at the 2003 Pan American Games
Volleyball players at the 2011 Pan American Games
Volleyball players at the 2012 Summer Olympics
Volleyball players at the 2016 Summer Olympics
Olympic volleyball players of Brazil
Olympic gold medalists for Brazil
Olympic medalists in volleyball
Medalists at the 2012 Summer Olympics
Pan American Games gold medalists for Brazil
Pan American Games medalists in volleyball
Setters (volleyball)
Medalists at the 2011 Pan American Games
Sportspeople from Recife